Frank Barton (born 22 October 1947) is an English retired footballer who played as a midfielder during the 1960s and 1970s.

Barton also gained international honours with England Youth team playing for his country in 5 international games in which he scored the first goal of a 3–0 victory over Spain at Swindon in 1966. He also obtained his English Football Association Full Coaching Certification in 1968 at the Lilleshall Training Centre.

He went on to play for Seattle Sounders of the North American Soccer League from 1979 until 1982. He also played indoor soccer for Seattle, the Wichita Wings and the Tacoma Stars.

In 1994, Barton became an assistant coach with the Seattle Sounders in the American Professional Soccer League.

Barton currently serves as a head coach with Emerald City Football Club in Seattle.

References

External links
 NASL/MISL stats

1947 births
Living people
English footballers
Association football midfielders
English Football League players
Major Indoor Soccer League (1978–1992) players
North American Soccer League (1968–1984) players
North American Soccer League (1968–1984) indoor players
Scunthorpe United F.C. players
Carlisle United F.C. players
Blackpool F.C. players
Grimsby Town F.C. players
AFC Bournemouth players
Hereford United F.C. players
Seattle Sounders (1974–1983) players
Tacoma Stars players
Wichita Wings (MISL) players
English football managers
English expatriate footballers
English expatriate sportspeople in the United States
Expatriate soccer players in the United States